Cesare Colombo (30 July 1930 – 30 July 1971), known as Joe Colombo, was an Italian industrial designer.

Life and career 

Cesare "Joe" Colombo was until 1949 educated at the Accademia di Belle Arti di Brera, the academy of fine arts, in Milano as a painter and studied afterwards until 1954 Architecture at Politecnico di Milano University.

In 1951 he joined the Movimento Nucleare, founded by Sergio Dangelo and Enrico Baj. The following four years Colombo was active as a painter and sculptor of the abstract Expressionism and exhibited his works with other members in Milano, Torino, Verviers, Venice and Brussels.

In 1955 Colombo joined the Art Concret group, but gave up his painting to promote his Design Career. Before he cooperated at an exhibition for the tenth Triennale of 1954 and documented the Ceramic Designs of an international meeting in Albisola. For his presentation Colombo created for example three exterior seatings which were combined with a "shrinelike" presentation of TVs.

In 1959, Colombo had to take over the family company, which produced electric appliances, and started to experiment with new construction and production technologies.  In 1962 Colombo opened his own interior design and architecture projects, mostly for lodges and skiing.

Colombo designed products for Oluce, Kartell, Bieffe, Alessi, Flexform, Stilnovo, and Boffi.

Colombo died in 1971 on his 41st birthday.

Main works

Together with his brother Gianni, Colombo developed the idea of prismatic lamps like the lamp Acrilica(1962). His first design for Kartell was the chair No.4801 (1963–1967) which consisted of three assembled plywood elements. The flowing elements of his chair were a foretaste of his later plastic designs, like the chair universale No.4860 (1965–1967), which was the first seating for adults made of ABS.

Moreover, Colombo produced innovative designs for furniture, lamps, glass, doorknobs, pipes, alarm clocks, and wristwatches. He created the professional camera Trisystem (1969), the air conditioner Candy (1970), dinnerware for Alitalia (1970; still in use), as well as an ergonomic and engined printing table.

Since the beginning of his career Colombo was most interested in living systems. His early modular container Combi-Centre of 1963 is an example for that. This preference for furniture systems led to designs like Additional Living System (1967–1968) and the chairs Tube (1969–1970) and Multi (1970), which could be assembled in various positions to get a great number of sitting positions.
They reflect Colombo's main goal, variability.

His futuristic designs were integrated micro-living-worlds. His Visiona-Livingroom of the future was exhibited at the Visiona-Exhibition of 1969. This room consisted of "Barbella-like" space interiors where furniture became structure elements and vice versa. Traditional furniture was replaced by functional elements like the sitting cubes Night-Cell and Central-Living as well as the Kitchen-Box, to create a dynamic, multifunctional living space.  The kitchen-box (1963), on wheels and measuring 90x75x75cm, containing a two-burner stovetop, oven, grill, refrigerator, cutting board, pull-out worktop, and storage for cookbooks, knives, and other tools, has recently been reissued, slightly enlarged (96 cm(h)x107cmx65cm), manufactured by Boffi Spa.

For his own apartment Colombo designed the units Roto-living and Cabriolet-Bed (both 1969), followed by Total Furnishing Unit, which was presented at the exhibition Italy: The Domestic Landscape at the Museum of Modern Art, New York in 1972. It presented a complete "living-machine," comprising kitchen, wardrobe, bathroom, and sleeping accommodation, on only 28 square meters.

 The Elda Chair (1963)
 The Brillio Chair (1971)
 The Topo Lamp (1970)

Exhibitions
His work has been exhibited at museums, among them the Museum of Modern Art in New York.

Awards
In 1964 Colombo received the IN-Arch prize for his room conception of a hotel in Sardinia (1962–1964). In 1967 and 1968, he was awarded ADI (Associazione per il Disegno Industriale) prize. In 1970 he received the Compasso d'Oro award.

Publications 

 Joe Colombo: l'invenzione del futuro. Mateo Kries (1st ed.). Milano: Skira. 2005. ISBN 88-7624-474-3. OCLC 61894828.

References

External links

Official website
Joe Colombo, Museum of Modern Art, New York
Triennale di Milano
SORELLARIUM: 13 Space age furniture
gallery at The IDE Virtual Design Museum
Gallery at architonic 
Short biography
Information and pictures about the designer Joe Colombo at the design agency TAGWERC 

1930 births
1971 deaths
Italian designers
Italian industrial designers
Industrial design
Place of birth missing
Place of death missing
Polytechnic University of Milan alumni
Brera Academy alumni
Compasso d'Oro Award recipients